Conalia is a genus of beetles in the family Mordellidae, containing the following species:

Conalia baudii Mulsant & Rey, 1858
Conalia helva (LeConte, 1862)
Conalia melanops Ray, 1946

References

Mordellidae genera